Discursive dominance or discursive power is the ultimate emergence of one discourse as dominant among competing ones in their struggle for dominance. Ultimately, one of the discourses emerges as dominant. The word ‘discursive’ is related to the word discourse, which refers to "communication of ideas".

In a society there are competing discourses (or narratives) regarding anything and everything such as feminism, racism, casteism, communalism, regionalism, economic development, democracy, governance, etc. According to Chanchal Kumar Sharma (2011, 169) 'A dominant discourse is a winning discursive formation. A complete consensus is not necessary, though. It is the one that survives the widest range of criticisms in various forums and media.'

References

Further reading

See also 
 Cultural hegemony
 Soft power

Discourse analysis